Eucalyptus xanthonema, commonly known as yellow-flowered mallee, is a species of mallee that is endemic to the south west of Western Australia. It has smooth bark, linear adult leaves, flower buds in groups of up to eleven, white to pale lemon-coloured flowers and barrel-shaped fruit.

Description
It has smooth grey and brownish bark that is shed in ribbons that sometimes accumulate near the base. Flowering occurs from September to December or from January to February and the flowers are white to pale lemon yellow.

Taxonomy and naming
Eucalyptus xanthonema was first formally described in 1847 by Nikolai Turczaninow in the journal Bulletin de la Société Impériale des Naturalistes de Moscou. The specific epithet (xanthonema) is derived from ancient Greek words meaning "yellow" and "thread", referring to the colour of the dried flowers.

In 1991, Ian Brooker and Stephen Hopper described two subspecies and the names are accepted by the Australian Plant Census:

Distribution and habitat
The yellow-flowered mallee grows in low mallee shrubland on plains and gentle slopes between Williams, the Stirling Range and the Fitzgerald River National Park. Subspecies apposita is restricted to the Stirling Range.

Conservation status
Both subspecies of E. xanthonema are classified as "not threatened" by the Western Australian Government Department of Parks and Wildlife.

See also
List of Eucalyptus species

References

Eucalypts of Western Australia
xanthonema
Myrtales of Australia
Mallees (habit)
Plants described in 1847
Taxa named by Nikolai Turczaninow